Maksim Petrovich Sutulin (born 2 January 1987) is a Russian former professional football player.

Club career
He played in the Russian Football National League for FC Baikal Irkutsk in the 2015–16 season.

External links
 
 
 Player page by sportbox.ru

1987 births
Sportspeople from Krasnoyarsk
Living people
Russian footballers
Association football goalkeepers
FC Yenisey Krasnoyarsk players
FC Zenit-Izhevsk players
FC Baikal Irkutsk players